Wagoner may refer to:

Places in the United States
 Wagoner, Arizona
 Wagoner, Indiana
 Wagoner, Oklahoma
 Wagoner County, Oklahoma
 Wagoner, West Virginia

People
 A person who drives a wagon, a Coachman
 Wagoner (surname)

Other uses
 Van Wagoner, American automobile, manufactured 1899–1903
 Wagoner Airport, Oregon
 Wagoner Armory, Oklahoma
 Wagoner Doctrine, American legal principle
 Wagoner High School, Oklahoma
 Wagoner Inlet, Antarctica
 Wagoner Tribune, Oklahoma
 Wagoner, formerly a billet title in the U. S. Army.